Re Astor’s Settlement Trusts [1952] Ch 534 is an English trusts law case, concerning the principle that non-charitable trusts must be for beneficiaries and not abstract purposes.

Facts
Waldorf Astor, private secretary to David Lloyd George and the husband of Lady Astor, the first woman to take her seat in the House of Commons, died. He had wished to create a trust for the ‘maintenance… of good understanding… between nations’ and ‘the preservation of the independence and integrity of newspapers’ with money from the shares he owned in his newspaper The Observer. The will was challenged on the basis that a trust for an abstract purpose, rather than for real people, could not be valid.

Judgment
Roxburgh J held that the trust failed because of the lack of beneficiaries, and it was uncertain. He said the following.

See also

English trust law

Notes

References

English trusts case law
1952 in British law
1952 in case law
High Court of Justice cases